Pycnoporellus fulgens is a species of fungus belonging to the family Fomitopsidaceae.

It is native to Eurasia and Northern America.

References

Fomitopsidaceae